Kuntighat  is a village in Hooghly district, West Bengal, India located on the banks of river Kunti. 

The main means of communication in this village is Sarak Path (Assam Road) and Rail Path (Kuntighat Railway).
It is situated on the banks of river Ganga, 5 km away from village.
The city of Tribeni.
It is an old sacred place for Hindus, whose sanctity has been recognized for many centuries and a Sanskrit part of the last quarter of the 12th century is mentioned in Pavandut.
Scholls include Bishpara high school, Chandrahati Dilip kumar high school and Gopalpur high school

Villages in Hooghly district